Jason Brilz (born July 7, 1975) is a retired American mixed martial artist who most recently fought in the Heavyweight division. A professional competitor since 2000, he has competed for the UFC, Titan FC, and King of the Cage.

Wrestling career
Brilz won the Nebraska Class A wrestling state championship in 1993 for Omaha Central High School. Along with his state title, Brilz was an Academic All-American in 1993. Brilz wrestled collegiately at the University of Nebraska-Omaha, where he was a three time Academic All-American, a four-year letter winner, and compiled a 63–34 career record.

Mixed martial arts career
Brilz made his MMA debut in 2000. He went on to achieve an 11-win streak and has entered into various talks with the UFC throughout the years with the aim of joining the organization. Brilz finally secured his debut deal to fight in his native Omaha, Nebraska, at the UFC Fight Night 15 event.

Ultimate Fighting Championship
Brilz defeated Brad Morris in his UFC debut via TKO (punches) midway through the second round.

Brilz then returned six months later to fight Tim Boetsch and won via unanimous decision at UFC 96.

Brilz' first loss in the UFC (and second in his career) came at the hands of The Ultimate Fighter 8 veteran Eliot Marshall, as Brilz lost via split decision, which was regarded as a controversial decision.

Brilz bounced back against Eric Schafer at UFC Live: Vera vs. Jones, defeating him via unanimous decision.

At UFC 114, Antônio Rogério Nogueira was scheduled to fight Forrest Griffin. However, Griffin had to pull out of the bout due to a shoulder injury, which left his slot open. With less than a month before the fight, Brilz stepped in to fight Nogueira. In a controversial split decision in which Brilz seemed to control the duration of the fight, Nogueira was declared the winner.  The bout won Fight of the Night honors.

Brilz was expected to face former IFL Light Heavyweight Champion Vladimir Matyushenko on November 13, 2010, at UFC 122.  However, Brilz was forced out of the bout with an injury and replaced by Alexandre Ferreira.

Brilz was expected to face undefeated Phil Davis on April 30, 2011, at UFC 129, but Davis pulled from that bout and fought Brilz' UFC 114 opponent Antônio Rogério Nogueira at UFC Fight Night 24, replacing an injured Tito Ortiz.  Brilz instead faced Vladimir Matyushenko at the event and lost via KO 20 seconds into the first round.

Brilz faced Ryan Bader on November 19, 2011 at UFC 139.  In the opening round, Bader caught Brilz with a straight right above the ear that knocked him out.  Subsequently, Brilz was released from the promotion.

Titan Fighting Championships
On November 16, 2012, Brilz then won against Will Dicke by KO 19 seconds into the second round. Brilz was expected to face Vinny Magalhaes at Titan FC 28 on April 25, 2014, however, Magalhaes was forced out of the bout due to injury, and was replaced by Raphael Davis. Brilz won the fight via split decision.

The fight with Magalhaes was re-booked and set to take place on September 26, 2014 at Titan FC 30, for the vacant Titan FC Light Heavyweight Championship. Brilz lost via guillotine choke submission in the fourth round.

Personal life
Brilz was an assistant coach at back to back Division II National Wrestling champs, the University of Nebraska-Omaha prior to cancellation of the University's wrestling program. Along with wrestling at UNO, Brilz also trains at Omaha's new Premier Combat Center with fellow UFC fighters Ryan Jensen and Jake Ellenberger.

Despite this relative success in his career, he has stated he is not interested in pursuing fighting full-time.
Brilz and his wife Rebecca have two daughters, Evelyn and Gabbi.

Mixed martial arts record

|-
| Win
|align=center| 23–6–1
|  Scott Hough
| Submission (kimura)
| DCS 16: Spring Brawl 2
| 
|align=center| 2
|align=center| 3:15
|Lincoln, Nebraska, United States
|Heavyweight bout.
|-
| Loss 
|align=center| 22–6–1
|  Vinny Magalhães
| Submission (guillotine choke)
| Titan FC 30
| 
|align=center| 4
|align=center| 0:36
|Cedar Park, Texas, United States
|
|-
| Win 
|align=center| 22–5–1
|  Raphael Davis
| Decision (split)
| Titan FC 28
| 
|align=center| 3
|align=center| 5:00
|Newkirk, Oklahoma, United States
|
|-
| Win
|align=center| 21–5–1
|  Dallas Mitchell
| Decision (unanimous)
| Victory Fighting Championship 41
| 
|align=center| 3
|align=center| 5:00
|Ralston, Nebraska, United States
|
|-
| Win
|align=center| 20–5–1
|  Josh Bryant
| Decision (majority)
| Victory Fighting Championship 39
| 
|align=center| 3
|align=center| 5:00
|Ralston, Nebraska, United States
|
|-
| Win
|align=center| 19–5–1
|  Will Dicke
| KO (punch)
| Disorderly Conduct 13: Legacy
| 
|align=center| 2
|align=center| 0:19
|Omaha, Nebraska, United States
|
|-
| Loss
|align=center| 18–5–1
|  Ryan Bader
| KO (punch)
| UFC 139
| 
|align=center| 1
|align=center| 1:17
|San Jose, California, United States
| 
|-
| Loss
|align=center| 18–4–1
|  Vladimir Matyushenko
| KO (punches)
| UFC 129
| 
|align=center| 1
|align=center| 0:20
|Toronto, Ontario, Canada
| 
|-
| Loss
|align=center| 18–3–1
|  Antônio Rogério Nogueira
| Decision (split)
| UFC 114
| 
|align=center| 3
|align=center| 5:00
|Las Vegas, Nevada, United States
|
|-
| Win
|align=center| 18–2–1
|  Eric Schafer
| Decision (unanimous)
| UFC LIVE: Vera vs. Jones
| 
|align=center| 3
|align=center| 5:00
|Broomfield, Colorado, United States
| 
|-
| Loss
|align=center| 17–2–1
|  Eliot Marshall
| Decision (split)
| UFC 103
| 
|align=center| 3
|align=center| 5:00
|Dallas, Texas, United States
| 
|-
| Win
|align=center| 17–1–1
|  Tim Boetsch
| Decision (unanimous)
| UFC 96
| 
|align=center| 3
|align=center| 5:00
|Columbus, Ohio, United States
| 
|-
| Win
|align=center| 16–1–1
|  Brad Morris
| TKO (punches)
| UFC Fight Night: Diaz vs. Neer
| 
|align=center| 2
|align=center| 2:54
|Omaha, Nebraska, United States
| 
|-
| Win
|align=center| 15–1–1
|  Erik Jenks
| Submission (rear-naked choke)
| Beatdown: 4 Bears Casino
| 
|align=center| 1
|align=center| 4:46
|New Town, North Dakota, United States
| 
|-
| Win
|align=center| 14–1–1
|  Aaron Praschak
| Submission (rear-naked choke)
| DFC 7: Revolution
| 
|align=center| 1
|align=center| 4:55
|Bismarck, North Dakota, United States
| 
|-
| Win
|align=center| 13–1–1
|  Rob Wince
| TKO (submission to punches)
| ACF: Exodus
| 
|align=center| 1
|align=center| 2:37
|Council Bluffs, Iowa, United States
| 
|-
| Win
|align=center| 12–1–1
|  Alex Schoenauer
| Submission (guillotine choke)
| VFC 11: Demolition
| 
|align=center| 2
|align=center| 4:06
|Council Bluffs, Iowa, United States
|Return to Light Heavyweight.
|-
| Win
|align=center| 11–1–1
|  Jason MacDonald
| Decision (split)
| KOTC: Edmonton
| 
|align=center| 2
|align=center| 5:00
|Edmonton, Alberta, Canada
|Middleweight debut.
|-
| Win
|align=center| 10–1–1
|  Jerry Spiegel
| KO
| VFC: Madness
| 
|align=center| 2
|align=center| 4:30
|Council Bluffs, Iowa, United States
| 
|-
| Win
|align=center| 9–1–1
|  Kyle Olsen
| TKO (punches)
| XKK: Des Moines
| 
|align=center| 2
|align=center| 2:00
|Des Moines, Iowa, United States
|
|-
| Win
|align=center| 8–1–1
|  Mike Patt
| TKO (corner stoppage)
| VFC 6: Overload
| 
|align=center| 2
|align=center| 5:00
|Council Bluffs, Iowa, United States
|Light Heavyweight bout.
|-
| Draw
|align=center| 7–1–1
|  Justin Eilers
| Draw
| VFC 4: Wildcard
| 
|align=center| 3
|align=center| 5:00
|Council Bluffs, Iowa, United States
| 
|-
| Win
|align=center| 7–1
|  Tony Mendoza
| Submission (rear-naked choke)
| ROF 7: Meltdown
| 
|align=center| 1
|align=center| 2:46
|Denver, Colorado, United States
| 
|-
| Win
|align=center| 6–1
|  Nate Schroeder
| Decision
| Victory Fighting Championships 1
| 
|align=center| 1
|align=center| 15:00
|Council Bluffs, Iowa, United States
|Heavyweight debut.
|-
| Loss
|align=center| 5–1
|  Vince Fields
| Submission (armbar)
| UW: Caged Fights
| 
|align=center| 1
|align=center| 1:45
|St. Paul, Minnesota, United States
| 
|-
| Win
|align=center| 5–0
|  Dennis Reed
| Submission (armbar)
| Iowa Challenge 2
| 
|align=center| 1
|align=center| 1:34
|Cedar Rapids, Iowa, United States
| 
|-
| Win
|align=center| 4–0
|  Brad Krane
| TKO (submission to punches)
| Gladiators 14
| 
|align=center| 1
|align=center| N/A
|Omaha, Nebraska, United States
| 
|-
| Win
|align=center| 3–0
|  John Herrera
| Submission (guillotine choke)
| MSF: Night of Thunder
| 
|align=center| 3
|align=center| N/A
|Fort Collins, Colorado, United States
| 
|-
| Win
|align=center| 2–0
|  Gary Hicks
| TKO (punches)
| Extreme Challenge 38
| 
|align=center| 1
|align=center| 2:29
|Council Bluffs, Iowa, United States
| 
|-
| Win
|align=center| 1–0
|  Mitch Rosland
| Submission (kimura)
| Gladiators 4
| 
|align=center| 3
|align=center| N/A
|N/A
|

Notes and references

External links

UFC Profile

Living people
American male mixed martial artists
Mixed martial artists from Nebraska
Light heavyweight mixed martial artists
Mixed martial artists utilizing collegiate wrestling
1975 births
Sportspeople from Bismarck, North Dakota
Omaha Central High School alumni
Ultimate Fighting Championship male fighters